Eight-ball is a pool game played with a solids-and-stripes ball set.

Eight-ball, 8-ball, or variants may also refer to:

Games
 Blackball (pool), or 8-ball pool, a British game played with a yellows-and-reds ball set
 8 ball, the black ball marked 8, in cue sports terminology
 Magic 8-Ball, a toy that resembles the pool ball and purports to predict the future

Music
 8 Ball Aitken (born 1981), Australian musician
 8Ball & MJG, an American hip hop duo
 8 Ball, an EP by the Burden Brothers, 2002
 Eight Ball, an EP by Joi Cardwell, 1998
 "8 Ball", a song by Underworld
 "8-Ball", a song by Pop Smoke from the album Faith, 2021
 "Eight Ball", a song by N.W.A. from N.W.A. and the Posse
 Eightball Records, an American record label

Intoxicants
 "8-ball", slang for one-eighth ounce (3.5 g) of a powdered psychoactive drug (typically cocaine, but also heroin, ketamine, or methamphetamine) 
8-Ball, slang for Olde English 800 brand malt liquor

Other uses
 8-Ball (comics), a Marvel Comics supervillain and his successors
 Eightball (comics), a Daniel Clowes comic book
 Eight Ball (film), a 1992 Australian film
 8-pallo, a 2013 Finnish film also known by its English-language name 8-ball
 8-ball, a variety of zucchini
 8-ball, an eight-dimensional -ball in mathematics
 8-Ball, a ring name used by Ronald Harris of the Harris Brothers
 The nickname of NASA Astronaut Group 21

See also
 Eight Ball Deluxe, a Bally pinball machine
 Behind the eight ball (disambiguation)